The Central Branch of the Greater Victoria Public Library (GVPL) is the system's main branch, located at 735 Broughton Street in the downtown core of Victoria, British Columbia, Canada. The Heritage Room includes a special collection with approximately 2,500 items related to the history of Vancouver Island.

References

External links
 
 Central Branch – Greater Victoria Public Library

Buildings and structures in Victoria, British Columbia
Public libraries in British Columbia